For Octavio Paz is the sixth album release from Six Organs of Admittance, released in 2003. This album marked a return to the lo-fi, intricate guitar work of Chasney's early work. Only the album's second track, "When you Finally Return" features Chasney's voice.

Track listing
"Fire on Rain"
"When You Finally Return"
"Memory, Memory, Memory"
"The Night Knows Nothing at All"
"Elk River"
"They Fixed the Broken Windmill Today"
"Rain on Fire"
"The Acceptance of Absolute Negation"

References

2004 albums
Six Organs of Admittance albums